Xie Jiaxuan (born 30 August 1994) is a Chinese speed skater who competes internationally.

He participated at the 2018 Winter Olympics and competed in the men's 500m event finishing on 31st position.

References

External links

1994 births
Living people
Chinese male speed skaters 
Olympic speed skaters of China 
Speed skaters at the 2018 Winter Olympics 
Speed skaters at the 2017 Asian Winter Games
21st-century Chinese people